Targeted killings in Pakistan (Urdu: نشانی قاتلوں or ہدفی ہلاکتو) have been a rising form of violence and have contributed to security instability in the country. They have become common and have gained attention especially in Karachi, Pakistan's largest city, economic capital and capital city of the Sindh province. Several targeted killings have also occurred in Quetta, the capital of the southern province of Balochistan. Police and law enforcement agencies have sometimes come under criticism for their ineffectiveness in locating the perpetrators and investigating their motives. For most part, targeted killings in Karachi have been attributed to political, religious and ethnic reasons. There are speculations about the killing but no real proof has been found against any party.

Overview
Karachi is a cosmopolitan city and consists of many ethnic communities; the city's demographics play an important role in its politics. Ethnic politics have resulted in sporadic violence throughout Karachi's history, often leading to bloody conflicts. Following the independence of Pakistan in 1947, Muslim immigrants from areas constituting modern-day India migrated in large numbers to the Muslim nation of Pakistan and became settled in Karachi, the historical capital of the Sindh province. The early migrants who came and settled are known as Muhajirs, something which was resented by a portion of the province's native Sindhi people and radical Sindhi nationalists. After the breakaway of East Pakistan in 1971 and the formation of Bangladesh, Pakistan accepted a large number of Biharis (known as "Stranded Pakistanis") loyal to the country, trapped in Bangladesh and offered them citizenship. The Bihari migrants assimilated into the diverse Urdu-speaking Muhajir population. Some Bengalis in Pakistan also stayed behind. 
The Pashtuns (Pakhtuns or Pathans), originally from Khyber Pakhtunkhwa, FATA and northern Balochistan, are now the city's second largest ethnic group in Karachi after Muhajirs. With as high as 7 million by some estimates, the city of Karachi in Pakistan has the largest concentration of urban Pakhtun population in the world, including 50,000 registered Afghan refugees in the city. As per current demographic ratio Pashtuns are about 25% of Karachi's population.

Karachi's status as a regional industrial centre attracted migrants from other parts of Pakistan as well, including Punjab, Balochistan and Pashtun migrants from the frontier regions. Added to this were Iranians, Arabs, Central Asians as well as thousands of Afghan refugees who came to Karachi, initially displaced by the Soviet invasion of Afghanistan; some of the Afghan and Pashtun migration brought along conservative tribal culture, further intensifying ethnic and sectarian violence and also giving rise to mob culture.

Prominent victims of target killings
This list is incomplete. Please help expand this list.
 Benazir Bhutto

 Murtaza Bhutto
 Athar Ali (scientist)
 Ameer Faisal Alavi
 Wali Khan Babar
 Rustam Jamali
 Safdar Kiyani
 Khalid Shahanshah
 Hussain Ali Yousafi
 Sabeen Mahmud
 Perween Rahman
 Mohsin Naqvi
 Hakeem Muhammad Saeed
 Maulana Yusuf Ludhianvi
 Amjad Sabri
 Ali Raza Abidi
 Liaquat Ali Khan
 Salman Taseer
 Afzal Kohistani

See also
 Gun politics in Pakistan
 Persecution of Hazara people
 Missing persons (Pakistan)
 July 2011 Karachi target killings
Targeted Killing in International Law
Targeted Killings: Law and Morality in an Asymmetrical World

References

External links
 Welcome to the jungle- Express Tribune
 Behind the violence in Karachi, 7 Sep 2011.
 Death of civility, The News International, 5 June 2012

 
Politics of Pakistan
Terrorism in Pakistan
Murder in Pakistan
Spree shootings in Pakistan
Human rights abuses in Pakistan